An anime adaptation of Maria†Holic directed by Akiyuki Shinbo and Yukihiro Miyamoto and produced by Shaft aired in Japan between January 5 and March 23, 2009 on Chiba TV, containing twelve episodes. Naoyuki Tatsuwa acted as assistant director, Masahiro Yokotani wrote the series composition, and Tatsuya Nishiwaki composed the series music. Hideyuki Morioka designed the characters and served as chief animation director with Hiroki Yamamura (Studio Pastoral). Half of the series was outsourced outside of Shaft: episodes 2, 5, 7, 9, and 11 to Studio Pastora; and episode 8 to Magic Bus. The first episode of the anime was aired as a special broadcast on Animate TV from December 26, 2008 to January 4, 2009 and on AT-X on December 30, 2008. The anime series has been licensed by Sentai Filmworks and is being distributed by Section23 Films. The complete collection was released on DVD, February 23, 2010. Sentai Filmworks re-released the first season on DVD and Blu-ray with an English dub (produced at Seraphim Digital) on January 28, 2014. The opening theme is "Hanaji" by Yū Kobayashi, and the ending theme is a cover version of Yellow Magic Orchestra's 1983 single  performed by Asami Sanada, Marina Inoue, and Yū Kobayashi, the voice actresses of the main characters.

A second anime season titled Maria†Holic: Alive, under the direction of Akiyuki Shinbo and Tomokazu Tokoro, began airing on April 8, 2011. Composer Tatsuya Nishiwaki and series composition writer Masahiro Yokotani returned for their respective roles, and Hideyuki Moroka once again designed the characters. However, Kenichi Ishikura replaced Naoyuki Tatsuwa as assistant director, and Noriyasu Yamauchi (Studio Pastoral) replaced both Hiroki Yamamura and Morioka as the chief animation director. Although Shaft is credited as the sole animation production company on the work, Studio Pastoral practically co-produced it. The first BD/DVD volume for Maria†Holic: Alive, which contains unaired bonus footage, was released on July 27, 2011. Sentai Filmworks has licensed the second season and simulcasted the series on the Anime Network video website. There is also a special ending song for episode 12, sung by Yū Kobayashi, titled  and was released on the same single as the other theme songs of the anime.

Episode list

Maria†Holic

Maria†Holic: Alive

Notes

References

Maria Holic